Kadian is a formulation of morphine.

Kadian may also refer to:
Satyawart Kadian (born 1993), Indian wrestler
Kadian (Ludhiana West), village located in Ludhiana district, Punjab